Orzubek Nazarov (born August 30, 1966 in Kant, Kyrgyz SSR) is a boxer of Uzbek/Kyrgyz ethnicity, who won the bronze medal at the 1986 World Amateur Boxing Championships in Reno. He is a former WBA Lightweight Champion.

Career

As an amateur Nazarov was the World bronze medalist in 1986 and European champion in 1987 and had a record of 153-12.

Pro
The southpaw turned pro in 1990 in Japan, one of the six Amateur Elite boxers (including Yuri Arbachakov) scouted out of the old Soviet Union by the Kyoei Gym.
He won the WBA lightweight title in 1993 in South Africa against Dingaan Thobela and defended it on the road against contenders Thobela, Joey Gamache and Leavander Johnson and two lesser fighters in his adopted home country.
Eye problems plagued him and he retired after being upset by Jean Baptiste Mendy in France.

Professional boxing record

See also
List of WBA world champions
List of lightweight boxing champions
List of Japanese boxing world champions
Boxing in Japan

External links

 

1966 births
Living people
People from Chüy Region
World boxing champions
Southpaw boxers
Kyrgyzstani male boxers
Kyrgyzstani people of Uzbek descent
Soviet male boxers
Honoured Masters of Sport of the USSR
AIBA World Boxing Championships medalists
Lightweight boxers